Mr. Justice Sayed Zahid Hussain was a judge of Supreme Court of Pakistan and a former Chief Justice of Lahore High Court, also served as Law Consultant to the President of Pakistan to hear the appeals against order of Federal Obudsman.

Life
Sayed Zahid Hussain was born on 15 December 1949 in village Chak Qazian of district Narowal. He acquired primary education from the village school and matriculation from G.D. Islamia High School Meingri. He obtained his LL.B  degree from Punjab University.<ref
name=LHC_1></ref>

Professional career

Syed Zahid Hussain enrolled as an advocate on 22 September 1972. He enrolled as advocate of Lahore High Court on 22 May 1975 and as advocate of Supreme Court of Pakistan on 21 June 1986. He also enrolled as advocate of the Supreme Court of Azad Jammu & Kashmir on 11 October 1997.

He was a Life Member of Lahore Bar Association, Lahore High Court Bar Association and Pakistan Supreme Court Bar Association.

Syed Zahid Hussain mostly practised on constitutional, and civil sides of law. He also had been a visiting lecturer for some time in the Punjab Law College and City Law College. Hussain was legal advisor for various organisations, including Associated Press of Pakistan (APP). He was a member of Zafar Law Associates, a law firm established by Mr. S. M. Zafar, a former law minister. He also contributed in the preparation of celebrated book titled "Understanding Statutes", The Cannons of construction (1997).

He had also been remained a company judge at the LHC, member committee for revision of High Court, member election tribunal, member LHC administration committee, chairman enrolment committee of the Punjab Bar Council and member of the Committee for Recruitment of additional District and Sessions Judges.

Justice Syed Zahid Hussain was appointed judge of the Lahore High Court on 21 May 1998 and was confirmed on 19 May 1999.

Justice Syed Zahid Hussain was made Chief Justice of the Lahore High Court on retirement of Justice Iftikhar Hussain Chaudhry, who retired on 31 December 2007. Justice Zahid was the 37th chief justice of LHC since its inception in 1866.

He was elevated to Supreme Court of Pakistan on 12 April 2009 and took oath on 13 April 2009.

He resigned from the Supreme Court of Pakistan on 24 February 2011.

Controversies

PCO Oath 1999
Justice Syed Zahid Hussain took oath on Provisional Constitutional Order 1999 as a sitting judge of Lahore High Court.

PCO Oath 2007

On 3 November 2007, Chief of Army Staff in Pakistan declared emergency and issued a Provisional Constitutional Order. A seven-member panel of Supreme Court of Pakistan, headed by Chief Justice Chief Justice Iftikhar Mohammad Chaudhry and consisting of Justice Rana Bhagwandas, Justice Javed Iqbal, Justice Mian Shakirullah Jan, Justice Nasir-ul-Mulk, Justice Raja Muhammad Fayyaz Ahmad, and Justice Ghulam Rabbani Judge Supreme Court, issued an order that declared the declaration of emergency as illegal and prohibited all judges to take oath on any PCO.

Justice Syed Zahid Hussain took oath on Provisional Constitutional Order 2007 as a sitting judge of Lahore High Court. He was among 13 out of 31 sitting judges of Lahore High Court who took oath on PCO. Along with him Nasim Sikandar, Mohammad Khalid Alvi, Sakhi Hussain Bokhari, Muhammad Bilal Khan, Mohammad Muzammal Khan, Syed Shabbar Raza Rizvi, Hamid Ali Shah, Tariq Shamim, Syed Asghar Haider, Hasnat Ahmad Khan and Justice Fazl-e-Miran Chohan as well as then Chief Justice of Lahore High Court Iftikhar Hussain Chaudhry took oath on PCO 2007. As on 19 April 2009, the PCO has not been given protection by any constitutional amendment. In the past, all PCO were at a later point given constitutional protection.

See also
 Lahore High Court
 Supreme Court of Pakistan
 President of Pakistan

Notes

People from Narowal District
1949 births
Living people
Chief Justices of the Lahore High Court
Justices of the Supreme Court of Pakistan